Code page 778 (also known as CP 778) is a code page used under DOS to write the Lithuanian language. It is a modification of code page 775 to support the accented Lithuanian letters and phonetic symbols for Lithuanian. This code page is also known as LST 1590-2.

Character set
The following table shows code page 778. Each character is shown with its equivalent Unicode code point. Only the second half of the table (code points 128–255) is shown, the first half (code points 0–127) being the same as code page 437.

Previously, code point 0xC2 mapped to ɜ (U+025B LATIN SMALL LETTER OPEN E), code point 0xDB mapped to █ (U+2588 FULL BLOCK), and 0xFE mapped to ■ (U+25A0 BLACK SQUARE).

References

778